Lee Ji-hyun (also Lee Ji-hyeon, ; born March 10, 1982) is a South Korean former swimmer, who specialized in individual medley events. She represented her nation South Korea in two editions of the Olympic Games (1996 and 2000), and also a top eight finalist in the 400 m individual medley at the 1998 Asian Games in Bangkok, Thailand.

Lee made her first South Korean team, as a fourteen-year-old teen, at the 1996 Summer Olympics in Atlanta, swimming only in the women's 400 m individual medley. There, she fought off a sprint freestyle challenge from Hsieh Shu-tzu to invincibly dip the five-minute barrier for the sixth spot and twenty-eighth overall in the opening heat, finishing with a time of 4:59.52. 

At the 2000 Summer Olympics in Sydney, Lee qualified for the second time in the 400 m individual medley by clearing FINA B-cut of 4:48.76 from the Dong-A Swimming Championships in Ulsan. Swimming in the last of four heats, Lee came from behind at the final turn to edge out Malaysia's Sia Wai Yen with a robust freestyle kick for the seventh seed in 4:58.94, just ten seconds below her submitted entry standard. Lee failed to advance into the semifinals, as she placed twenty-third overall on the first day of prelims.

References

1982 births
Living people
South Korean female medley swimmers
Olympic swimmers of South Korea
Swimmers at the 1996 Summer Olympics
Swimmers at the 2000 Summer Olympics
Sportspeople from Gyeonggi Province
Swimmers at the 1998 Asian Games
Asian Games competitors for South Korea
20th-century South Korean women